Beata Maria Szydło (née Kusińska , 15 April 1963) is a Polish politician who has served as a Member of the European Parliament (MEP) since 2019. A member of Law and Justice (PiS), she previously served as Prime Minister of Poland from 2015 to 2017. Szydło became the third woman to hold the office, after Hanna Suchocka and her immediate predecessor Ewa Kopacz. She currently is a vice-chair of the European Conservatives and Reformists (ECR) group in the European Parliament.

She successfully led the presidential campaign of Andrzej Duda, Law and Justice's nominee for President of Poland, to victory. In June 2015, Szydło won internal endorsement to be her party's candidate for Prime Minister at the forthcoming parliamentary election. On 25 October, Law and Justice went on to win majority government for the first time in the country's history; Szydło was duly appointed Prime Minister on 16 November by President Duda.

She was a vocal critic of numerous European Union policies, particularly on immigration, and robustly defended her government from criticism by other EU leaders. During her time in office, she was ranked 31st in Forbes magazine's ranking of the world's 100 most powerful women and the 10th among the most influential female political leaders. In December 2017, she was forced to resign as Prime Minister after Jarosław Kaczyński, the Chairman of Law and Justice, withdrew confidence from her to continue as the party's lead election candidate within the Sejm. Her resignation was accepted by President Duda, who at the same time designated her deputy, Mateusz Morawiecki to be the new Prime Minister. Morawiecki took office three days later, and immediately appointed Szydło his Deputy Prime Minister.

Szydło stood for the European Parliament at the 2019 European Parliament elections, and was elected to represent the constituency of Lesser Poland and Świętokrzyskie; she received the highest number of individual votes of any candidate historically in Poland. She subsequently resigned as Deputy Prime Minister.

Early years and education
Szydło was born in Oświęcim and raised near Brzeszcze, where her father was a miner. She graduated from Jagiellonian University in Kraków in 1989 where she completed studies at the Department of Ethnography. In the years 1989 – 1995, she was a PhD student at the Philosophy and History Faculty of that university. In 1997, she completed post-graduate studies for managers of culture at Warsaw School of Economics, whereas in 2001 at Kraków University of Economics - management of local government in the European Union.

Early political career
Szydło was elected Mayor of Gmina Brzeszcze at the age of 35, holding this position for seven years. During her campaign, along with locals she helped renovate the school in a small town of Pcim, which lost its roof in a storm.  In 2004, she participated in International Visitor Leadership Program. In September 2005, she was elected to the Sejm, the lower house of the Parliament of the Republic of Poland receiving 14,499 votes in 12 Chrzanów district, as a candidate of the conservative Law and Justice party. She was elected member of the 5th, 6th, 7th and 8th Parliament of the Republic of Poland. She was appointed vice-chairman of the Law and Justice Party On 24 July 2010, and later in September 2014, she succeeded Stanisław Kostrzewski as the treasurer of the Law and Justice party.

Following her successful leadership of Andrzej Duda's presidential campaign, at the Law and Justice party convention on 20 June 2015 Szydło was named as Law and Justice's candidate for Prime Minister in the Polish parliamentary election. She was widely seen as being more moderate than Law and Justice chairman Jarosław Kaczyński.

At the October 2015 election, Law and Justice won a decisive victory, becoming the first Polish party to win an outright majority since the end of Communism. Szydło was sworn in as prime minister on 16 November 2015.

Prime Minister of Poland, 2015–2017

On 18 October 2015 she made her keynote address (pl), further receiving 236 votes in favour of her government. One of her first decisions was to remove the European Union flag from press conferences at the Chancellery of the Prime Minister and to replace the clock in the meeting hall of the Council of Ministers with a Cross. In meetings with voters, she promised to reduce the retirement age and raise the minimum wage. She declared introducing the 500+ programme will be her priority as Prime Minister. The programme was introduced on 1 April 2016, supplying families with 500PLN for every child, starting from the second child. It is intended to serve as a demographic stimulus, and enhance population growth.

One of the biggest controversies during her administration, the Polish Constitutional Court crisis, 2015 was officially criticized by the European Parliament, which, on 13 April 2016, passed a resolution declaring that the Parliament "is seriously concerned that the effective paralysis of the Constitutional Tribunal in Poland endangers democracy, human rights and the rule of law".

Beata Szydło's government was strongly opposed to the UK's effort to stop EU immigrants claiming in-work benefits for four years if they moved to Britain. Increasing the support for Brexit, Beata Szydło did offer support in return for a permanent base of NATO troops on Polish territory.

In December 2017, Jarosław Kaczyński, the Chairman of the Law and Justice party, declared Szydło's position untenable. This had followed a deterioration in relations between Poland and the rest of the European Union. In a statement, Law and Justice stated that: “This shows us how we are perceived outside of our borders, the state of our relations with our partners, why we are supported, why we get attacked, and how the actions of our government and of our organisations are perceived by the other Member States. All of this had an impact on the government’s decision (to replace Szydło).”

On 7 December, she resigned from office, along with all members of her cabinet. The next day her resignation was accepted by the President Andrzej Duda, who at the same time designated Finance Minister and Deputy Prime Minister Mateusz Morawiecki as the new Prime Minister.

Later career
Szydło was appointed Deputy Prime Minister of Poland by her former deputy, Mateusz Morawiecki, several days after her resignation as Prime Minister.

Szydło later stood for the European Parliament at the 2019 European Parliament elections, and was elected to represent the constituency of Lesser Poland and Świętokrzyskie. In that election, she received the highest number of individual votes of any European Parliamentary candidate in Poland's history. She resigned as Deputy Prime Minister on 4 June in order to take her seat in the European Parliament.

Personal life
Szydło is married to Edward Szydło. The couple has two sons: Tymoteusz (born 1992), a  former Catholic priest, and Błażej (1994). She is a devout Catholic and declares her adherence to conservative Christian values.

Security incidents
On 21 November 2016, Szydło's vehicle was involved in a 5 vehicle crash in Israel which included a police car and ambulance. She was in Israel for the government to government talks and to meet with Prime Minister Benjamin Netanyahu. Just a few months later, on 10 February 2017, Szydło and 2 security officials were injured in a car crash in her hometown, Oświęcim. Her Audi limousine swerved and hit a tree to avoid a small Fiat whose driver was later charged with involuntary violation of traffic safety. She suffered bruises and was hospitalised in Warsaw.

State visits gallery

See also
Cabinet of Beata Szydło
History of Poland (1989–present)
List of political parties in Poland
List of politicians in Poland
Politics of Poland
2015 Polish parliamentary election
2015 Polish presidential election

References

External links

 
Beata Szydło's entry on the Sejm website  

|-

1963 births
Living people
Female heads of government in Poland
Law and Justice politicians
Members of the Polish Sejm 2005–2007
Members of the Polish Sejm 2007–2011
Members of the Polish Sejm 2011–2015
Members of the Polish Sejm 2015–2019
MEPs for Poland 2019–2024
People from Oświęcim
Jagiellonian University alumni
Polish Roman Catholics
Prime Ministers of Poland
Women government ministers of Poland
Women mayors of places in Poland
Women members of the Sejm of the Republic of Poland
Women MEPs for Poland
Women prime ministers
21st-century Polish women politicians